Proteuxoa cryphaea is a moth of the family Noctuidae. It is found in New South Wales and Victoria.

References 

Proteuxoa
Moths of Australia
Moths described in 1908